Eldon Worobieff (17 May 1939 – 1 February 2013) was a Canadian rower. He competed in the men's eight event at the 1964 Summer Olympics.

References

External links

1939 births
2013 deaths
Canadian male rowers
Olympic rowers of Canada
Rowers at the 1964 Summer Olympics
Place of birth missing
Commonwealth Games medallists in rowing
Commonwealth Games bronze medallists for Canada
Rowers at the 1962 British Empire and Commonwealth Games
Pan American Games medalists in rowing
Pan American Games gold medalists for Canada
Rowers at the 1963 Pan American Games
Medallists at the 1962 British Empire and Commonwealth Games